Falmouth School (formerly Trescobeas County Secondary School) is a coeducational secondary school and sixth form with academy status, located in Falmouth in the county of Cornwall.

Previously a community school administered by Cornwall Council, Falmouth School converted to academy status on 1 August 2011. However the school continues to coordinate with Cornwall Council for admissions. The school also has plans to sell its playing fields to buy the former Budock Hospital site and turn it into a sports centre for use by the school and local community.

Falmouth School offers GCSEs and BTECs as programmes of study for pupils, while students in the sixth form have the option to study from a range of A-levels, OCR Nationals, NVQs and further BTECs.

In 2019, the school received a rating of Inadequate in an Ofsted inspection, the lowest possible rating you can get from one.

Notable former pupils
 Mike Barnett, Australian politician
 Matthew Etherington, footballer
 Sarah Newton, politician
 Oliver Parker, film director
 Charlotte Watts, mathematician, epidemiologist and academic

References

External links
Falmouth School official website

Secondary schools in Cornwall
Buildings and structures in Falmouth, Cornwall
Academies in Cornwall